Marc-Kevin Peter Goellner (born 22 September 1970) is a former professional tennis player from Germany. He won two singles titles, achieved a Bronze medal in doubles at the 1996 Summer Olympics and attained a career-high singles ranking of World No. 26 in April 1994. Goellner reached the quarterfinals of the 1997 Rome Masters, defeating top tenners Richard Krajicek and Albert Costa en route.

Personal life
The son of a German diplomat, Goellner lived in Rio de Janeiro, Tel Aviv & Sydney as a youngster before moving to Germany in 1986. The surname of his Family is Göllner, but since most languages don´t use Umlaut (linguistics), the brazil authorities wrote Goellner in his birth certificate.

Tennis career
In 1990, he suffered two torn ligaments in his left foot, which almost ended his tennis career before it had begun. He turned professional in 1991.

1993 provided some of the most significant highlights of Goellner's career. He captured his first top-level singles title at Nice, defeating Ivan Lendl in the final. He also won his first tour doubles title in Rotterdam, partnering David Prinosil. Goellner and Prinosil were also the men's doubles runners-up at the French Open that year. And Goellner was a member of the German team which won the 1993 Davis Cup, winning important singles rubbers in the quarter-finals, semi-finals and final.

In 1996, Goellner won a second top-level singles title at Marbella. He represented Germany at the 1996 Summer Olympics in Atlanta, Georgia, where he was defeated in the first round of the singles competition by Sweden's Thomas Enqvist, and won a Bronze Medal in the doubles competition at Stone Mountain Park, partnering Prinosil.

During his career, Goellner won a total of two top-level singles titles and four tour doubles titles. His career-high rankings were World No. 26 in singles (in 1994), and World No. 25 in doubles (in 1998). His best singles performance at a Grand Slam event came at the French Open in 1993, where he reached the fourth round before losing to Andrei Medvedev. His career prize money earnings totalled US$2,700,215. He was one of the first players to wear baseball caps reversed. Goellner retired from the professional tour in 2004.

ATP career finals

Singles: 3 (2 titles, 1 runner-up)

Doubles: 15 (4 titles, 11 runner-up)

ATP Challenger and ITF Futures Finals

Singles: 5 (3–2)

Doubles: 6 (3–3)

Performance timelines

Singles

Doubles

External links 
 
 
 

German male tennis players
German people of Brazilian descent
Tennis players at the 1996 Summer Olympics
Olympic tennis players of Germany
Olympic bronze medalists for Germany
1970 births
Living people
Olympic medalists in tennis
Medalists at the 1996 Summer Olympics
Sportspeople from Rio de Janeiro (city)